Ladrón de Corazones, It is an American telenovela produced by Telemundo and Argos Comunicación in 2003. It was a remake of the hit 1995 Argentinian series Poliladron created and starring Adrian Suar.

Cast 

 Lorena Rojas as Verónica Vega
 Manolo Cardona as Gustavo Velasco
 Humberto Zurita as Antonio Vega
 Roberto Mateos as Esteban de Llaca
 Fabiola Campomanes as Inés Santoscoy
 Claudia Lobo as Celia Tapia de Velasco
 Marcos Valdés as Ramiro Barrientos
 Raúl Arrieta as Froylan Narváez
 Roberto Medina as Padre Anselmo Tapia
 Marco Treviño as Mateo
 Sergio Ochoa as Tarta
 Lisa Owen as Magdalena Tapia
 Wendy de los Cobos as María Castillo
 Teresa Selma as Doña Francisca Zambrano de Velasco
 Paola Ochoa as Refugio
 Enoc Leaño as Ibañez
 Aarón Beas as Gabriel
 Carlos Coss as El Chino
 Alberto Guerra as Tony Castillo
 Marisol Centeno as Claudia Barrientos
 Teresa Tuccio as Susan Estévez
 Daniela Bolaños as Nancy Barrera
 Marisol del Olmo as Marcela
 Álvaro Guerrero as José Salvador Martínez 'Chepe'
 Marcelo Buquet as Patricio Benítez
 Luis Gerardo Méndez as Raúl
 Patricia Marrerro as Teresa
 Angélica Celaya as Renata
 Gabriel Porras as Román
 Alfredo Ahnert as Charles
 Rubén Cristiany as Obispo
 Rodolfo Arias as Carlos
 Luis Cárdenas as Secretario Manuel
 Alfonso Diluca as Leonardo de la Lama
 Emilio Guerrero as Leyva
 Eugenio Montessoro as Hernán Ferreira
 Irineo Alvarez as Secretario
 Roberto Montiel as Presidente
 Guillermo Ríos as Manuel Martínez
 Marco Antonio Aguirre as Chetas
 Candela Ferro as Elena Aragón
 Seraly Morales as Doctor
 Raúl Ortiz as Doctor
 Erwin Veytia as Virgilio
 Hugo Albores as Islas
 Adrian Alonso as Niño
 Fernando Banda as Fernando
 Moisés Cardez as Sicario
 José Antonio Coro as Doctor
 Ignacio Flores de la Lama as Jugador
 Marcela Espeso as Vendedora
 Jaime Estrada as Gerente de Boxeo
 John Gertz as Bill Carson
 Aurora Gil as Acompañante
 Antonio Gozat as El Chato
 Héctor Holten as. El director de la cárcel
 César Izaguirre as Testigo protegido
 Paco Mauri as Juez
 David Rencoret as Francisco Santoscoy
 Patricia Rozitchner as Silvia
 Juan Ríos Cantú as Emilio Escobar
 Alejandro Usigli as Narco
 Jorge Victoria as Espinoza
 Keyla Wood as Anna
 Luis Yeverino as Secuestrador
 Antonio Zagaceta as Ugalde
 Marco Zetina as Narco

External links 
 Página oficial de Telemundo

Telemundo telenovelas
2003 telenovelas
2003 American television series debuts
2003 American television series endings
American telenovelas
Argos Comunicación telenovelas
Spanish-language American telenovelas
American television series based on Argentine television series